Saint Andrew East Rural is a parliamentary constituency represented in the House of Representatives of the Jamaican Parliament. It elects one Member of Parliament MP by the first past the post system of election.

Boundaries 

The constituency includes Constitution Hill, Dallas Castle, Gordon Town, Maryland, Woodford and Mavis Bank.

Members of Parliament

Elections

References

Parliamentary constituencies of Jamaica